Jabari Levey (born July 16, 1984) is a former American football offensive lineman. He played his college football at South Carolina.

After a "poor" senior season, Levey went undrafted in the 2006 NFL Draft. He was signed by the Oakland Raiders, but released before playing a game. He later was acquired by the Berlin Thunder.

References

External links 
 South Carolina Gamecocks bio

1984 births
Living people
American football offensive linemen
South Carolina Gamecocks football players
Berlin Thunder players